Ryan Rodney Reynolds (born October 23, 1976) is a Canadian-American actor and film producer. He began his career starring in the Canadian teen soap opera Hillside (1991–1993), and had minor roles before landing the lead role on the sitcom Two Guys and a Girl between 1998 and 2001. Reynolds then starred in a range of films, including comedies such as National Lampoon's Van Wilder (2002), Waiting... (2005), and The Proposal (2009). He also performed in dramatic roles in Buried (2010), Woman in Gold (2015), and Life (2017), starred in action films such as Blade: Trinity (2004), Green Lantern (2011), 6 Underground (2019), and Free Guy (2021), and provided voice acting in the animated features The Croods film series (2013–2020), Turbo (2013), and Pokémon: Detective Pikachu (2019).

Reynolds's biggest commercial success came with the 20th Century Fox X-Men films Deadpool (2016) and Deadpool 2 (2018), in which he played the title character. The former set numerous records at the time of its release for an R-rated comedy and his performance earned him nominations at the Critics' Choice Movie Awards and the Golden Globe Awards.

Reynolds was named Peoples Sexiest Man Alive in 2010 and was awarded a star on the Hollywood Walk of Fame in 2017. As a businessman, he holds an ownership stake in Mint Mobile and is a co-owner of Welsh football club Wrexham A.F.C.; the latter was documented in the TV series Welcome to Wrexham.

Early life
Ryan Rodney Reynolds was born on October 23, 1976, in Vancouver, British Columbia. He is the youngest of four sons. His father, James Chester Reynolds, was a Royal Canadian Mounted Policeman before retiring from the force and going to work as a foods wholesaler. His mother, Tamara Lee (née Stewart) worked in retail sales. Reynolds has two brothers who work in law enforcement in British Columbia, one of whom followed his father into the RCMP. His paternal grandfather, Chester Reynolds, was a farmer who represented Stettler in the Legislative Assembly of Alberta from 1940 to 1944. Reynolds has Irish and Scottish ancestry, and was raised in the Roman Catholic Church in Vancouver's Kitsilano neighbourhood.

Reynolds has been involved in acting since age thirteen. He graduated from Kitsilano Secondary School in 1994, which he attended with actor Joshua Jackson. Reynolds played small roles in a number of television series, but became discouraged and quit acting at age 19 to enroll at Kwantlen Polytechnic University. A few months later he ran into fellow actor Chris William Martin, who convinced him to try again and move with him to Los Angeles.

Career

1991–2003: Early work
Reynolds's career began in 1991 when he starred as Billy Simpson in the Canadian-produced teen soap opera Hillside, distributed in the United States by Nickelodeon as Fifteen. In 1993, Reynolds played a child who moves from India to Canada after the death of his father in the film Ordinary Magic. Between 1993 and 1994, he had a recurring role in The Odyssey as Macro. In 1996, he had a supporting role as Jay "Boom" DeBoom in "Syzygy", the thirteenth episode of the third season of The X-Files, and co-starred with Melissa Joan Hart in the TV movie Sabrina the Teenage Witch. In 1996, Reynolds played Bobby Rupp, boyfriend of murdered teen Nancy Clutter, in a two-part miniseries In Cold Blood, an adaptation of Truman Capote's non-fiction novel of the same name. He also appeared in the anthology The Outer Limits episode "Origin of the Species", which originally aired on November 14, 1998. Beginning in 1998, Reynolds starred in Two Guys, A Girl and a Pizza Place, playing medical student Michael "Berg" Bergen, throughout the show's four-season run. He starred in the National Lampoon movie Van Wilder in 2002, appeared in The In-Laws with Michael Douglas and Albert Brooks, and also in the Canadian production Foolproof in 2003.

2004–2015: Romantic comedies and widespread recognition

Although he had performed primarily in comedies, Reynolds underwent intense physical training to play an action role as the character of Hannibal King in the 2004 film Blade: Trinity. The same year, he made a cameo appearance in Harold & Kumar Go to White Castle as a nurse. Reynolds played George Lutz in the 2005 remake of the 1979 horror film The Amityville Horror. Also in 2005, he played a waiter named Monty in Waiting... and appeared as music executive Chris Brander in the romantic comedy Just Friends alongside Amy Smart and Anna Faris. In Just Friends, Reynolds lip-synced "I Swear" over the end credits.  Additionally, he played an FBI agent alongside Ray Liotta in the 2006 crime action film Smokin' Aces. Reynolds played the protagonist in the 2008 film Definitely, Maybe. He also appeared in the second-season finale of the television series Scrubs. In 2007, Reynolds guest-starred as Brendan's friend Hams in the episode "Douchebag in the City" of the TBS sitcom My Boys.

Reynolds portrayed Wade Wilson / Weapon XI in a supporting role in the prequel 20th Century Fox X-Men film, X-Men Origins: Wolverine, which was released in 2009. He had previously spoken of his interest and involvement in a possible film adaptation of Deadpool with screenwriter David S. Goyer as far back as 2005. 2009 also saw Reynolds portray Andrew Paxton, opposite Sandra Bullock, in The Proposal, and Mike Connell in Adventureland.

In 2010, Reynolds starred in the Spanish and American thriller Buried, which screened at the Sundance Film Festival. In June 2010, Reynolds was invited to join the Academy of Motion Picture Arts and Sciences. Reynolds portrayed the Hal Jordan version of superhero Green Lantern in Warner Bros.' film Green Lantern, which was released on June 17, 2011. The film did not fare well either financially or critically, but his role made him one of the few actors to headline films based on both Marvel and DC characters. In 2011, he co-starred in the comedy The Change-Up, as well as narrating the documentary film The Whale. In 2012, he portrayed an agent in Safe House, alongside Denzel Washington. He then had starring roles in two DreamWorks Animation feature films, The Croods and Turbo, both released in 2013. His next role was portraying Nick Walker in the Universal Pictures film adaptation of Dark Horse Comics' R.I.P.D. (Rest in Peace Department), which was released in 2013. Reynolds went on to star in low-budget films, The Voices and The Captive in 2014, as well as Mississippi Grind the following year. This was followed by a supporting role in the financially successful biographical film, Woman in Gold, before he returned to the thriller genre with Self/Less, also in 2015.

2015–present: Established actor and Marvel work

In 2016, Reynolds found critical and commercial success with Deadpool, a film that had been in development as early as 2000. After portraying Wade Wilson / Weapon XI, without the name Deadpool, in X-Men Origins: Wolverine, he became heavily involved in the development of a Deadpool film. Deadpool featured a reboot of the character, ignoring the events of X-Men Origins: Wolverine, and establishing a new backstory for the character that was closer to the Marvel Comics source material. The film takes place within the larger 20th Century Fox X-Men film universe, being made possible by the reset timeline in X-Men: Days of Future Past. Deadpool made several box-office records, including: a worldwide opening of $264.9 million from 62 markets, which is the biggest of 2016, the biggest for an R-rated film, and the second biggest for Fox, only behind Star Wars: Episode III – Revenge of the Sith ($303.9 million). It also recorded the biggest IMAX 2D worldwide opening of all time with $27.4 million from 606 IMAX theatres, eclipsing The Dark Knight Rises ($23.8 million). The film's financial and critical success led the studio to move forward with a sequel.

Also in 2016, Reynolds had a supporting role in the Ariel Vromen-directed thriller Criminal. On December 15, 2016, Reynolds received a star on the Hollywood Walk of Fame at 6801 Hollywood Boulevard. Reynolds co-starred with Jake Gyllenhaal and Rebecca Ferguson in the science fiction thriller Life in 2017, which reunited him with Safe House director Daniel Espinosa. Reynolds began filming Deadpool 2 in June 2017. The film opened on May 18, 2018. In May 2019, he starred as the titular character in Pokémon Detective Pikachu, a live action film adaptation of the Detective Pikachu video game. Reynolds voiced, and was the facial motion capture actor for the CGI detective Pikachu.

In January 2019, Reynolds was named the face of Armani Code leading with a campaign for their Absolu scent. Also that year, he starred in the Netflix action thriller film 6 Underground, directed by Michael Bay. The film was released on December 13.

Reynolds is an executive producer of ABC's game show, Don't, which premiered on June 11, 2020.  In January 2019, it was announced that he would return as the voice of Guy in the sequel to The Croods. The film, The Croods: A New Age, was also released in 2020.

In 2021, Reynolds starred in three films. The first, Hitman's Wife's Bodyguard, is an action comedy film directed by Patrick Hughes and written by Tom O'Connor and Brandon and Phillip Murphy. The film is a sequel to the 2017 film The Hitman's Bodyguard which also featured Reynolds, Samuel L. Jackson, Salma Hayek, and Richard E. Grant, who reprised their roles. Beginning April 2019, Reynolds shot his second 2021 film, science fiction action comedy film Free Guy, directed by Shawn Levy, from a screenplay by Matt Lieberman and Zak Penn, and a story by Lieberman. Reynolds stars as "a background character who realizes he's living in a video game. With the help of an avatar, he tries to prevent the makers of the game from shutting down his world." Also featuring Jodie Comer, Lil Rel Howery, Utkarsh Ambudkar, Joe Keery and Taika Waititi, the film was theatrically released in the United States on August 13 by 20th Century Studios. In his last film of the year, Reynolds starred alongside Dwayne Johnson and Gal Gadot in Netflix's thriller Red Notice, written and directed by Rawson Marshall Thurber.

In October 2021, Reynolds announced he was taking "a little sabbatical" from his work after the production of Spirited. In March 2022, Reynolds starred in Netflix's science-fiction adventure film The Adam Project, directed by Shawn Levy.

Business ventures

In January 2018, Reynolds started the production company Maximum Effort and signed a three-year first-look deal with Fox. Maximum Effort is in development on a live-action adaptation of the board game Clue, to be penned by Deadpool writers Rhett Reese and Paul Wernick. On June 23, 2021, the marketing division of Maximum Effort Production was spun off as a separate company, and acquired by MNTN Software. Reynolds is the driving force of Maximum Effort and has created ads for a number of his film projects and for brands such as Peloton and R.M. Williams.

Reynolds acquired a stake in Aviation American Gin in February 2018. He stated that his interest went beyond that of an owner, and that he planned to oversee the product's creative direction as well as taking an active role in the business.

In November 2019, Reynolds purchased an ownership stake in Mint Mobile. It was later revealed that Reynolds owns between 20% and 25% of Mint Mobile. He joined the board of Match Group in July 2020. In August 2020, Diageo announced it was acquiring Aviation American Gin in a deal valued at up to $610 million.

On September 23, 2020, the Wrexham Supporters Trust announced that a business partnership consisting of Reynolds and fellow actor Rob McElhenney was in talks to purchase the Welsh football club Wrexham AFC. On November 16, it was confirmed that Reynolds and McElhenney took over the club after receiving the backing of the Wrexham Supporters Trust. In February 2021, the Financial Conduct Authority approved their takeover of Wrexham. The process of Reynolds and McElhenney's investment in Wrexham was covered by the 2022 TV documentary series Welcome to Wrexham.

As soon as Reynolds and Rob McElhenney became involved with Wrexham AFC, they also took interest in Welsh culture, specifically their use of Welsh language, with them first advertising their club takeover with a Welsh translator. Reynolds asked that Welsh subtitles be included with his Netflix movie Red Notice, which was also advertised within Wrexham. In 2022, Reynolds and McElhenney were awarded the Diolch Y Ddraig award by Welsh language TV station S4C for their role promoting Welsh culture.

On May 3, 2021, Ryan Reynolds was part of an investor group led by Greylock Partners that made a $750 Million investment into Wealthsimple.  Reynold's exact ownership amount was not disclosed, but this investment round valued the Canadian financial startup company at $5 Billion CAD.

In August 2022 Ryan Reynolds took an equity stake in FuboTV. Reynolds, his Maximum Effort studio and Fubo announced a co-production partnership that will include the launch of the Maximum Effort Network on FuboTV. Reynolds and his team will create original content for the forthcoming channel.

In November 2022, reports began circulating that Reynolds was interested in purchasing ownership of the Ottawa Senators, which were to be sold by the estate of the late Eugene Melnyk. Reynolds confirmed that he was looking to acquire a stake in the team in a November 7 appearance on The Tonight Show, telling host Jimmy Fallon that he would "need a partner with really deep pockets" to accomplish this. The following day he attended a Senators game at the Canadian Tire Centre, and received a standing ovation from the crowd. It was subsequently reported that he had been meeting with different consortiums that were planning to bid on the team, as well as with NHL commissioner Gary Bettman.

On March 15, 2023, T-Mobile announced it was acquiring Mint Mobile in deal valued at up to $1.35 Billion. Based on his ownership stake, Reynolds' proceeds from the acquisition is between $270337.5 million.

Public image, work and recognition

In October 2008, Reynolds wrote for The Huffington Post regarding his plan to run the 2008 New York City Marathon for his father who, at the time, suffered from Parkinson's disease. Reynolds appeared in Peoples Sexiest Man Alive lists in 2007 and 2009, and was awarded the top honour in 2010. On February 12, 2012, Reynolds appeared on the BBC's Top Gear as the Star in a Reasonably-Priced Car. He posted a time of 1:43.7. On the May 13, 2018, broadcast of the South Korean reality television show King of Mask Singer, Reynolds had a special performance in the opening act, singing "Tomorrow".

For his work, Reynolds has received widespread recognition and accolades. After having a role in the Canadian drama series Hillside, he was nominated for a Young Artist Award in 1993. For his role as Deadpool in the 2016 Marvel film of the same name, he received the Critics' Choice Movie Award for Best Actor in a Comedy and a Golden Globe nomination in the same category. For the soundtrack of the 2018 sequel, he received a Grammy nomination for Best Compilation Soundtrack for Visual Media. His other achievements include three MTV Movie & TV Awards, three People's Choice Awards and a Saturn Award.

Charity
In May 2020, Reynolds was among a group of celebrities who read an instalment of Roald Dahl's children's fantasy novel James and the Giant Peach in aid of the global-non profit charity Partners In Health, co-founded by Dahl's daughter Ophelia, which had been fighting COVID-19 in vulnerable areas.

In January 2023, he was named the winner of the Academy of Canadian Cinema and Television's Humanitarian Award at the 11th Canadian Screen Awards.

Personal life

Reynolds began dating singer Alanis Morissette in 2002, and they announced their engagement in June 2004. In February 2007, representatives for the pair announced they had mutually decided to end their engagement. Morissette said her album Flavors of Entanglement was created out of her grief after the split, and the song "Torch" was written about Reynolds.

Soon after the end of his relationship with Morissette in 2007, Reynolds began dating actress Scarlett Johansson. They announced their engagement in May 2008, and married on September 27 of that year, in a private ceremony near Tofino, British Columbia. On December 14, 2010, they announced their separation. Reynolds filed for divorce in Los Angeles on December 23, and Johansson filed her response simultaneously. The divorce was finalized on July 1, 2011.

Reynolds first met Blake Lively in early 2010 while filming Green Lantern, in which they co-starred. They began dating in October 2011 and married on September 9, 2012, at Boone Hall Plantation in Mount Pleasant, South Carolina. In the wake of civil rights protests in 2020, Reynolds publicly apologized and expressed deep regret for using that venue due to its association with slavery; he and Lively renewed their vows at home in New York. The couple have three daughters and a baby: born December 2014, September 2016, 2019, and February 2023. In September 2022, Lively herself revealed that they are expecting their fourth child to prevent paparazzi from stalking the family's home for candid photos of her pregnancy.

The family reside in Pound Ridge, New York. Reynolds and Lively are close friends with singer-songwriter Taylor Swift, who named the characters in her song "Betty" after their daughters.

Reynolds has openly spoken about his lifelong struggle with anxiety, noting in 2018 that he carried out many interviews in the character of Deadpool to alleviate his fears. He became a U.S. citizen  2018.

On November 26, 2021, Governor General Mary Simon awarded Reynolds a Governor General's Performing Arts Award to recognize his philanthropic work and significant contributions to the cultural life of Canada. Sandra Bullock, Morena Baccarin, Michael J. Fox, and Hugh Jackman made pre-recorded speeches in support of, and to congratulate Reynolds on the award.

In the aftermath of the 2022 Russian invasion of Ukraine, Reynolds and Lively pledged to "match up" to $1 million for Ukrainian refugees fleeing the conflict in Ukraine.

In March 2022, Lively and Reynolds made another donation, amounting to $500,000 to Water First, to provide indigenous people in Canada with clean water and training to young people to become professional technicians in environmental issues.

Notes

References

External links
 
 
 

1976 births
Living people
20th-century American male actors
20th-century Canadian male actors
20th-century Roman Catholics
21st-century American businesspeople
21st-century American male actors
21st-century Canadian businesspeople
21st-century Canadian male actors
21st-century Roman Catholics
American drink industry businesspeople
American film producers
American male child actors
American male comedians
American male film actors
American male television actors
American male voice actors
American people of Irish descent
American philanthropists
American soccer chairmen and investors
Association football chairmen and investors
Businesspeople from New York (state)
Businesspeople from Vancouver
Canadian drink industry businesspeople
Canadian emigrants to the United States
Canadian expatriate male actors in the United States
Film producers from British Columbia
Canadian male child actors
Canadian male comedians
Canadian male film actors
Canadian male television actors
Canadian male voice actors
Canadian people of Irish descent
Canadian philanthropists
Canadian Roman Catholics
Canadian soccer chairmen and investors
Catholics from New York (state)
Comedians from New York (state)
Comedians from Vancouver
Drinking establishment owners
Kwantlen Polytechnic University alumni
Lively family
Male actors from New York (state)
Male actors from Vancouver
People from Pound Ridge, New York
People with acquired American citizenship
Skydance Media people
Wrexham A.F.C. non-playing staff
Canadian Screen Award winners